The IBM Technical Disclosure Bulletin was a technical publication produced by IBM between 1958 and 1998.  The purpose of the Bulletin was to disclose inventions that IBM did not want their competitors to get patents on. The Bulletin was a form of defensive publication. By publishing the details of how to make and use the invention, patent examiners could have a searchable source of prior art that they could cite against subsequent patent applications filed by others on the same or similar inventions.

The Bulletin has been cited over 48,000 times in various United States patents.

See also
United States Statutory Invention Registration
Patent Commons Project

References

External links 
 IBM notice regarding the availability of the IBM technical disclosures (via Internet Archive)
Searchable Web site for IBM Technical Disclosure Bulletin articles www.delphion.com (This is a commercial Web site. Registration may be required)

History of patent law
Technical Disclosure Bulletin
Publications established in 1958
Publications disestablished in 1998